South Euclid is a city in Cuyahoga County, Ohio, United States. It is an inner-ring suburb of Cleveland located on the city's east side. As of the 2010 census the population was 22,295.

Geography
Acting approximately as a central point for the east side of the Greater Cleveland area, South Euclid is bordered by Cleveland, Cleveland Heights, University Heights, Beachwood, Lyndhurst, Richmond Heights, and Euclid.

History 
The land currently comprising South Euclid was part of the Western Reserve, obtained via treaty with the Iroquois confederation in 1796 by the Connecticut Land Company. In 1797, Moses Cleaveland named the area east of the Cuyahoga River Euclid, after the Greek mathematician and "patron saint" of surveyors. Euclid Township was officially formed in 1809. In 1828, Euclid Township was divided into nine districts, with South Euclid becoming district two.

The earliest industry was farming. But, by the 1860s, quarrying of the area's rich Bluestone deposits replaced agriculture as the town's economic mainstay. Two separate locations – one along Nine Mile Creek near present-day Quarry Park at South Belvoir and Monticello Boulevards, and the other along what is today part of the Euclid Creek reservation – were consolidated by Forest City Stone Company in the 1870s, creating one of the region's largest producers of the stone. By the end of the 19th century, the northern section of the town had become known as Bluestone village.

Residents of South Euclid eventually wanted autonomy from the larger Euclid Township, and voted on October 13, 1917, to be incorporated as a village, with Edward C. Foote being elected the first mayor a few weeks on November 6. At the same time, with the decline of the Bluestone industry brought on by improvements to poured concrete, Bluestone village was absorbed into South Euclid.

South Euclid's rapid economic and population growth continued in the early decades of the 20th century, partly driven by industry in nearby Cleveland.  Due in part to funding by the WPA, which helped keep people employed through the Great Depression, the village continued to grow and was officially incorporated as a city in 1941.

Population growth, which tapered during the Depression era, skyrocketed during the postwar period, driven by both the baby boom and white flight from the urban center of Cleveland.  South Euclid's population peaked in the early 1970s.  By 1980, lacking large tracts of available land for development, and with a population shift to exurban communities, the population of South Euclid began to shrink.

Demographics

Like Cleveland Heights to the west and University Heights to the south, South Euclid is racially integrated. A large portion of the city's population consists of African-Americans, Italian-Americans, Jews, and immigrants from Russia and other former Soviet republics.

According to the 2010 Census, 89.9% of South Euclid's residents spoke English, 3.2% Russian, 1.7% Spanish, 1.2% Italian, and 1.0% Yiddish as their first language.

The median income for a household in the city was $59,423, and the median income for a family was $72,340. The per capita income for the city was $27,343. About 6.7% of families and 9.3% of the population were below the poverty line, including 10.1% of those under age 18 and 6.9% of those age 65 or over.

Of the city's population over the age of 25, 37.9% hold a bachelor's degree or higher.

2010 census
As of the census of 2010, there were 22,295 people, 8,913 households, and 5,791 families residing in the city. The racial makeup of the city was 54.1% White, 40.7% African American, 0.1% Native American, 2.0% Asian, 0.7% from other races, and 2.5% from two or more races. Hispanic or Latino of any race were 2.0% of the population.

There were 8,913 households, of which 32.6% had children under the age of 18 living with them, 41.9% were married couples living together, 19.1% had a female householder with no husband present, 4.0% had a male householder with no wife present, and 35.0% were non-families. 29.9% of all households were made up of individuals, and 9.7% had someone living alone who was 65 years of age or older. The average household size was 2.43 and the average family size was 3.04.

The median age in the city was 37.9 years. 24% of residents were under the age of 18; 10% were between the ages of 18 and 24; 25.2% were from 25 to 44; 27.7% were from 45 to 64; and 12.9% were 65 years of age or older. The gender makeup of the city was 45.6% male and 54.4% female.

Education
The South Euclid-Lyndhurst City School District consists of:

 3 elementary schools: Adrian, Rowland, and Sunview
 1 upper elementary school (grades 4–6): Greenview
 1 junior high school (Grades 7–8): Memorial
 1 high school: Charles F. Brush.

There is one parochial elementary school, one Catholic college preparatory school, and one college located in South Euclid:

 St. John's, a Lutheran school located on Mayfield Road, St. John's school opened in the mid-1850s.
 The Lyceum, a Catholic coeducational, college preparatory school offering a classical curriculum for grades seven through twelve.
 Notre Dame College, a Roman Catholic college located on Green Road, north of Cedar. Notre Dame was established in 1922 as an all-female institution. After 79 years, the college became coed in January 2001. In addition to their brick and mortar school, Notre Dame College offers online degree programs through the schools online campus.

Former schools:

 Victory Park Elementary School: Built in 1921 and located on the corner of Victory Drive and Mayfield Road. Demolished in 1983. Current site of a Giant Eagle Supermarket.
 Richmond Road Elementary School: Opened 1924, closed June 14, 1973. Located at the corner of Mayfield Road and Richmond Road in Lyndhurst, the building is now the South Euclid-Lyndhurst Board of Education building.
 Andrew J. Anderson Elementary School: Built in 1952 on Anderson Road in Lyndhurst.  In the 1980s, it was leased to Ratner-Montessouri private schools.  The building was torn down in 2007 and the land is currently being used as an athletic field.
 Lowden Elementary School: Opened September 9, 1954 and closed June 8, 2007. In 2009 the building was torn down and the land converted to green space.
 Southlyn Elementary School: Located in Lyndhurst. Currently used for a preschool program and community room.
Sacred Heart of Jesus, a Roman Catholic school located south of the intersection of Green and Mayfield roads. Established in 1925 as St. Gregory The Great, the school was renamed to Sacred Heart of Jesus in 2010 after its merger with the now defunct St. Margaret Mary. Sacred Heart of Jesus closed after the 2016 school year and merged with St. Clare in Lyndhurst at the end of the 2015–16 school year.
 South Euclid High School: Located on Green Road. Closed when replaced by Brush High School in 1927.
 Regina High School: Opened in 1954, Regina was a parochial high school for girls. Regina's basketball team was the Ohio State Girls' Basketball Champions from 2000 to 2003, and also took the title in 2005.  In October 2009, citing a 'steady decline in enrollment' over the years, it was announced that Regina High School would close following the graduation of the 2010 class.  The building was purchased by nearby Notre Dame College.

Preschools:

 South Euclid Cooperative Preschool.

A small portion of South Euclid is located within the Cleveland Heights-University Heights City School District. Campuses zoned to this area include the Early Childhood Center (Preschool), Gearity Professional Development School (Grades K-5), Wiley Middle School (Grades 6–8), and Cleveland Heights High School (Grades 9–12).

Supplementary schools:

 The Japanese Language School of Cleveland (JLSC; クリーブランド日本語補習校 Kurīburando Nihongo Hoshūkō), a weekend Japanese supplementary school for Japanese nationals and Japanese Americans, previously held its classes in Regina High School.

Parks and recreation

There are four city-owned public parks: Quarry (divided by Monticello Boulevard into distinct North and South sections), Victory, Bexley, and Oakwood.

Quarry has a splash/sprinkle park, Victory sand volleyball courts, and Bexley a swimming pool.  Quarry, Victory, and Bexley have playground equipment, and all four parks permit picnicking (although grilling facilities only remain at Bexley's pavilion and at Quarry North).
Quarry and Bexley both have baseball diamonds utilized by the city's public baseball and softball leagues.  Quarry Park North features a fenced off dog park, where canines can play unleashed, with a separate section for smaller dogs.

The southern portion of the Euclid Creek reservation of the Cleveland Metroparks is located in South Euclid.  Nearby, the South Euclid War Memorial lists the names of those who died while serving in wartime.

South Euclid has partnered with nearby Lyndhurst to form several recreational groups:

 SELREC- South Euclid Lyndhurst Recreation. Founded in June 1946. Offers programs to community residents to meet the needs of the recreational needs.
 SELSC- South Euclid Lyndhurst Soccer Club. Offers recreational soccer and a competitive league. The recreational league runs its program in the spring and fall. The competitive league is a travel program that runs throughout the year.
 SELYFL- South Euclid Lyndhurst Youth Football League. Formed In Fall 1997. Recruits children from 1st to 6th grade. It is meant to be a feeder system for the Brush Arcs football team.
 SEYSBA- South Euclid Youth Softball and Baseball Association
 SELBA- South Euclid Lyndhurst Basketball Association

South Euclid ranked 10th out of the 114 largest cities in Ohio in terms of walkability.

Telling Mansion

The historic William E. Telling mansion, which is on the National Register of Historic Places. served as home to the South Euclid-Lyndhurst branch of the nationally renowned Cuyahoga County Public Library system. A wing of this same building, which once served as the gardener's quarters, houses the South Euclid - Lyndhurst Historical Society.  In 2012, the CCPL announced plans to sell the Telling mansion and move the Library to a new facility at 1876 South Green Road. In September, 2013, the Library board voted to sell the Mansion to Cleveland investor Richard A. Barone.  The mansion now houses the Museum of American Porcelain Art.

Notable people
Steve Stone – former MLB All-Star pitcher and broadcaster. The 1980 American League Cy Young Award winner grew up in South Euclid. Stone spent his prep years pitching at Charles F. Brush High School.
 David S. Ward – screenwriter and director, lived in South Euclid as a youth, most famous for The Sting in 1973, and Major League in 1989. Ward wrote the latter film as a tribute to his favorite childhood baseball team, the Cleveland Indians.
 Carl E. Walz - Astronaut. Flew on four shuttle missions and spent over six months conducting experiments on the International Space Station.

References

External links

The Telling Mansion Preservation Organization

Cities in Ohio
Cities in Cuyahoga County, Ohio
Populated places established in 1917
Cleveland metropolitan area
1917 establishments in Ohio